Strymon daraba is a butterfly of the family Lycaenidae. It was described by William Chapman Hewitson in 1867. It is found in Ecuador and Peru.

References

 "Strymon daraba (Hewitson, 1867)". Insecta.pro. Retrieved February 4, 2020.

daraba
Lycaenidae of South America
Lepidoptera of Ecuador
Invertebrates of Peru
Butterflies described in 1867
Taxa named by William Chapman Hewitson